Yellow lily may refer to:

Plants
Yellow waterlily, a common name for several plants 
Calochortus luteus, or yellow mariposa lily
Nuphar advena, or yellow pond-lily
Hemerocallis lilioasphodelus, or yellow daylily
Hemerocallis citrina, or long yellow day lily
Lilium canadense, or wild yellow-lily
Erythronium grandiflorum, or yellow avalanche lily
Amorphophallus galbra, or yellow lily yam, a root vegetable

Other uses
Yellow Lily, a 1928 American silent drama film

See also
Golden lily (disambiguation)
Lilium, true lilies
Zantedeschia, or arum lily
Taxonomy of Narcissus